Goanna is an open-source browser engine that was forked from Mozilla's Gecko. It is used in the Pale Moon and Basilisk browsers. It underlies the Interlink mail client, Hyperbola's IceWeasel, and other UXP-based applications. It was also unofficially ported to Windows XP for the K-Meleon browser and Mypal.

Goanna as an independent fork of Gecko was first released in January 2016. The project's founder and lead developer, M. C. Straver, had both technical and trademark motives to do this in the context of Pale Moon's increasing divergence from Firefox. There are two significant aspects of Goanna's divergence: it does not have any of the Rust language components that were added to Gecko during Mozilla's Quantum project, and applications that use Goanna always run in single-process mode, whereas Firefox became a multi-process application.

References

2016 software
Cross-platform software
Free layout engines
Free software programmed in C++

Gecko-based software
Software forks
Software that uses Cairo (graphics)